Alan Stewart Kaye (1944-2007) was an American linguist and professor at California State University, Fullerton. He is best known for his works on Semitic and other language families.
He died of cancer on May 31, 2007.

Books
 Semitic Studies in Honor of Wolf Leslau, A. Kaye, ed.(1991)
 The Persian Contributions to the English Language: A Historical Dictionary, Garland Cannon and Kaye S. Alan, Wiesbaden: Harrassowitz Verlag, 2001
 Afroasiatic Linguistics, Semitics, and Egyptology: Selected Writings of Carleton T. Hodge, Co-edited with Scott Noegel. Bethesda, MD: CDL Press, 2004
 Chadian and Sudanese Arabic in the Light of Comparative Arabic Dialectology, De Gruyter Mouton 1976
 Pidgin and creole languages : a basic introduction, with Alan S.l Tosco, 2001
 A Dictionary of Nigerian Arabic. California: Undena Publications. 1982.
Morphologies of Asia and Africa (ed.), Penn State University Press 2007

References

1944 births
Linguists from the United States
American phonologists
2007 deaths
University of California, Berkeley alumni
California State University, Fullerton faculty
Morphologists
Historical linguists
Linguists of pidgins and creoles
Arabists
Linguists of Persian